The 2019 CARIFTA Games took place between 20 and 22 April 2019. The event was held at the Truman Bodden Sports Complex in George Town, Cayman Islands.

Medal summary

Boys U-20 (Junior) 

†: Open event for both junior and youth athletes.

Girls U-20 (Junior)

†: Open event for both junior and youth athletes.

Boys U-17 (Youth)

Girls U-17 (Youth)

Medal table

References

External links 
Official website 

CARIFTA Games
CARIFTA Games
CARIFTA Games
CARIFTA Games
CARIFTA Games
International sports competitions hosted by the Cayman Islands
CARIFTA Games